Hegvik Church is a parish church of the Church of Norway in Ørland municipality in Trøndelag county, Norway. It is one of the churches for the Bjugn parish which is part of the Fosen prosti (deanery) in the Diocese of Nidaros. The white, stone church was built in a long church style in 1858 using plans drawn up by the architect Christian Heinrich Grosch (1801–1865). The church seats about 300 people.

History
The parish of Bjugn was established by royal decree on 21 July 1852 with Bjugn Church as the main parish church and Nes Church and a new church in Stjørna as annexes to the main church. Permission to build a new church in Stjørna on the Hegvik farm (sometimes spelled Heggvik) was also granted at the same time. Hegvik Church is a long church built out of stone with exterior plaster covering the stone.

See also
List of churches in Nidaros

References

Ørland
Churches in Trøndelag
Long churches in Norway
Stone churches in Norway
19th-century Church of Norway church buildings
Churches completed in 1858
1858 establishments in Norway